Cyperus alvesii is a species of sedge that is native to Brazil.

See also 
 List of Cyperus species

References 

alvesii
Plants described in 2008
Flora of Brazil